The Cologne High Military and Escort Road (also called the Hohe Straße) is a historical trading route that ran from the city of Cologne via the imperial cities of  Wetzlar and Friedberg to Frankfurt within the Holy Roman Empire.

This historic road ran along the eastern edge of the Westerwald mountains via Greifenstein and crossed the River Lahn in Wetzlar. In addition to its function as a trading road this highway was also used as a pilgrims' way from Cologne to Marburg. The so-called Elizabeth Path (Elisabethpfad) had the grave of Saint Elizabeth of Thuringia in Marburg as its destination. This historical pilgrimage route was waymarked as the Way of St. James in 2007. The section of the old road between Butzbach and Wetzlar is recorded in 1315 and 1349 in deeds no. 441 and 758 at Arnsburg Abbey.

External links 
 Ancient roads in Hesse

Literatur 
 Friedrich Kofler: Alte Straßen in Hessen, Trier, 1893
 Georg Landau: Beiträge zur Geschichte der alten Heer- und Handelsstraßen in Deutschland.
 

Ancient roads and tracks
History of the Westerwald
Transport in Hesse